Tucanje is a village in the municipality of Petnjica, Montenegro.
The village has been subject to widespread ridicule (mostly over the internet) in recent years, due to the word "Tucanje" carrying an alternative meaning in Serbo-Croatian, as the Nominative case of a verb denoting sexual intercourse.

Demographics
According to the 2011 census, its population was 289.

References

Populated places in Petnjica Municipality